Yellow Bayou is an unincorporated community in Chicot County, Arkansas, United States.

References

Unincorporated communities in Chicot County, Arkansas
Unincorporated communities in Arkansas